Anarchism is a small minority political movement in Iceland, defined by its relationship with other progressive social movements, and its involvement in primarily ideological work.

Philosophy

Interest among anarchist writers

Anarchist historians and philosophers have looked to the Icelandic Commonwealth with interest since the 19th century. The Russian anarchist Peter Kropotkin first noted in his book Mutual Aid that Norse society, from which the settlers in Iceland came, had various "mutual aid" institutions, including communal land ownership (based around what he called "the village community") and a form of social self-administration, the "Thing" – both local and Iceland-wide – which can be considered a "primitive" form of the anarchist communal assembly. Anarchist geographer Elisée Reclus also noted that in Iceland they "succeeded completely in maintaining their dignity as free man, without kings, feudal principles, hierarchy or any military establishment." They governed themselves through a process in which "the common interest was discussed in the open air by all inhabitants, who were dressed in armor, the symbol of the absolute right of personal self-defense belonging to each individual."

See also
Libertarian Society of Iceland

Notes

References

 
Politics of Iceland
Iceland